Aconquija National Park, formerly known as Campo de los Alisos National Park, is a federal protected area in Tucumán Province, Argentina. Established on 9 August 1995, it houses a representative sample of the Southern Andean Yungas montane forest biodiversity in good state of conservation.

Geography
The Aconquija Mountains are the southern extension of the Calchaquí Valleys, the western first steps raising from the Gran Chaco plain into the Andes. The park protects the headwaters of the Jaya and las Pavas rivers.

Flora and fauna
Flora and fauna vary considerably with elevation. The Southern Andean Yungas montane forests extend from 1500 to 2000 meters elevation. Andean alder (Alnus acuminata subsp. acuminata) is the predominant tree, forming pure stands in places.

Wildlife in the park includes the puma (Puma concolor), ocelot (Leopardus pardalis), Andean mountain cat (Leopardus jacobita), Pampas cat (Leopardus colocolo), Geoffroy's cat (Leopardus geoffroyi), South American gray fox (Lycalopex griseus), Pampas fox (Lycalopex gymnocercus), guanaco (Lama guanicoe), gray brocket (Mazama gouazoubira), Chaco owl (Strix chacoensis), turquoise-fronted amazon (Amazona aestiva), mountain parakeet (Psilopsiagon aurifrons), and grey-hooded parakeet (Psilopsiagon aymara).

Endangered animals that dwell in the park include the Andean mountain cat, furtive tuco-tuco (Ctenomys occultus) Chaco eagle (Buteogallus coronatus), and the frog Gastrotheca gracilis. Vulnerable birds include the white-tailed shrike-tyrant (Agriornis albicauda), rufous-throated dipper (Cinclus schulzii), and Tucumán mountain finch (Poospiza baeri).

History
Campo de los Alisos National Park ("field of the alders") was established in 1995. In 2018 the park was renamed Aconquija National Park and enlarged to its current boundaries.

Climate

References

External links
 Parque Nacional Aconquija, Administración de Parques Nacionales - National Parks Administration of Argentina (in Spanish)

National parks of Argentina
Protected areas of Tucumán Province
Southern Andean Yungas
Protected areas established in 1995